Centaurea scabiosa, or greater knapweed, is a perennial plant of the genus Centaurea. It is native to Europe and bears purple flower heads.

Greater knapweed is found growing in dry grasslands, hedgerows and cliffs on lime-rich soil. Upright branched stems terminate in single thistle-like flowerheads, each having an outer ring of extended, purple-pink "ragged" bracts which form a crown around the central flowers. The plant has deeply dissected leaves which form a clump at the base.

This species is very valuable to bees. It is also a magnet for many species of butterfly. Among them is the marbled white.

This is the only known food plant for caterpillars of the Coleophoridae case-bearer moth Coleophora didymella. Centaurea scabiosa has been used in traditional herbal healing as either a vulnerary or an emollient.

The plant is sometimes confused with devils-bit scabious, however the leaves on this plant are arranged alternately, whereas in devils-bit they are opposite.

Description
This perennial herb grows with an erect grooved stem up to 90 cm high. The leaves are alternate,  pinnatifid and with stalks. The flower heads are 5 cm across and on long stalks. The florets are red-purple.

Habitat
Dry grassland, roadsides and calcareous substrate.

Distribution
Found in Great Britain and Ireland.

Images

References

 The Wild Flower Key British Isles-N.W. Europe by Francis Rose, page 385

External links
 
 
 

scabiosa
Flora of France
Flora of Denmark
Flora of Estonia
Flora of Germany
Flora of Ireland
Flora of Italy
Flora of Latvia
Flora of Lithuania
Flora of Norway
Flora of Russia
Flora of Spain
Flora of the United Kingdom
Plants described in 1753
Taxa named by Carl Linnaeus